In Chinese mythology, Nieh-ching-t'ai is a mirror in Diyu, the Chinese underworld. It is also known as the Mirror of the Wicked, the Mirror of Retribution, and the Mirror of Past Existences.

Description 
Souls are forced to stand in front of it and see their true selves, namely the events of their previous existences. The Yama King then makes his judgment.

It stands in the Court of the First Yama King and faces to the east, on a raised stand eleven feet in height. The mirror has a circumference of six feet.

Notes

References 

Buddhism in China
Buddhist mythology
Chinese mythology
Mirrors